Brett Gale is an Australian former professional rugby league footballer who played in the 1980s. He played for Western Suburbs, Eastern Suburbs and North Sydney in the NSWRL competition.

Background
Gale is the older brother of the late Scott Gale

Playing career
Gale made his first grade debut in round 10 of the 1982 NSWRL season against Parramatta at Lidcombe Oval. Gale played from the bench as Wests defeated the defending premiers 19-7. Gale played another season with Western Suburbs in 1983 where they finished with the Wooden Spoon before transferring to Eastern Suburbs. Gale was limited to only four appearances with Easts as they finished second last on the table. Gale then transferred back to Western Suburbs with the club continuing to struggle on the field claiming the wooden spoon in 1987 and 1988. In 1989, Gale signed for North Sydney but only made two appearances for the club, the last being against Parramatta where they won 34-18 at North Sydney Oval in round 5 of the competition.

Personal life
Following retirement from rugby league, Gale became a police officer with the NSW Police Force. In 2006, Gale was charged for robbing a Brisbane pub and later jailed for four years over the incident. In 2010, Gale was ordered to stand trial over another pub which was robbed in Nimbin.

References

1964 births
Western Suburbs Magpies players
Sydney Roosters players
North Sydney Bears players
Australian rugby league players
Rugby league second-rows
Rugby league centres
Living people